The Frank Wess Quartet is an album by jazz flautist Frank Wess which was recorded in 1960 and released on the Moodsville label.

Reception

The Allmusic site awarded the album 4 stars stating "Frank Wess has long been one of the most underrated flautists in jazz, but it's his primary instrument on this CD reissue of a Moodsville LP recorded in 1960... Highly recommended".

Track listing 
 "It's So Peaceful in the Country" (Alec Wilder) - 4:01   
 "Rainy Afternoon" (Frank Wess) - 8:26   
 "Star Eyes" (Gene de Paul, Don Raye) - 3:54   
 "Stella by Starlight" (Ned Washington, Victor Young) - 5:10   
 "But Beautiful" (Johnny Burke, Jimmy Van Heusen) - 4:36   
 "Gone with the Wind" (Herb Magidson, Allie Wrubel) - 5:46   
 "I See Your Face Before Me" (Howard Dietz, Arthur Schwartz) - 6:05

Personnel 
Frank Wess - flute, tenor saxophone
Tommy Flanagan - piano
Eddie Jones - bass 
Bobby Donaldson - drums

References 

Frank Wess albums
1960 albums
Moodsville Records albums
Albums produced by Esmond Edwards
Albums recorded at Van Gelder Studio